The Mayflower Park Hotel in Seattle, Washington is a hotel built in 1927 which claims to be the oldest continuously operating hotel in downtown Seattle. Its façade includes extensive terra cotta detailing.

It was opened in 1927 as the Bergonian, built by Stefan Berg, a prominent Seattle realtor and builder who had previously built a number of other hotels in the city, as well as apartments and family homes. It was designed by the firm of Stuart & Wheatley, who had worked with Berg on several previous projects that incorporated his surname (The Stephensberg and Berg, later Biltmore, apartments on Capitol Hill). With 240 rooms, it was constructed in six months at a cost of $750,000, opening to the public ahead of schedule on the evening of July 16, 1927.

It is now a 160-room hotel, and has six meeting and banquet rooms. The hotel was renamed to the Mayflower in 1974 after it was bought for $1.1 million by a limited partnership that gave control to Marie and Birney Dempcy. The Mayflower Park had previously been in foreclosure and in need of repairs, necessitating an extensive renovation.

The hotel is adjacent to the Westlake Center, a mall and office complex which was built in the 1980s and has a direct connection between the buildings. The mall's construction plan originally included demolition of the hotel, but it was saved by a lawsuit from the ownership group.

It is a member of the Historic Hotels of America, and was named the "Best Historic Hotel (76-200 Guestrooms)" in the 2017 Historic Hotels Awards of Excellence.

References

External links
Mayflower Park Hotel, official site

Hotels in Seattle
Buildings and structures completed in 1927
Historic Hotels of America